Andarkuppam, is the fastest developing residential area in North Chennai, near Ponneri in Tamil Nadu, India. It is touted to be one of the best residential place in the locale.

Indigenous people have travelled and settled in the village for agricultural and allied business over the years. But, the recent surge in world class educational institutions opening up in and around the village, it has brought people from all over the country thereby making the village as one of densely occupied locality. The major economy of the village still bank on agriculture. The real estate sector has seen a huge upsurge since the beginning of the century. It is a definite the hottest real estate investment destination considering the fact about the JICA (Japan International Cooperation Agency) proposed a Smart City development in Ponneri.

Sri Balasubramanya Swami Temple

External links
Corporation of Chennai

Neighbourhoods in Chennai